MTF Voskhod is a rural locality (a settlement) in Ertil, Ertilsky District, Voronezh Oblast, Russia. The population was 394 as of 2010. There are 4 streets.

Geography 
MTF Voskhod is located 2 km northwest of Ertil (the district's administrative centre) by road. Ertil is the nearest rural locality.

References 

Rural localities in Ertilsky District